Vercelli (Italian: Provincia di Vercelli) is a province in the Piedmont region of northern Italy. Its capital is Vercelli.

It is an area known for the cultivation of rice.

Main sights

In 2003, UNESCO added the Sacred Mountain of Varallo to the World Heritage List.

Other historical sights include the Basilica of Sant'Andrea in Vercelli. There are also numerous natural sights in the Valsesia area.

See also
Communes of the Province of Vercelli

References

External links
Official website
Official web site for European Sacred Mountains 

 
Vercelli
Wine regions of Italy